Sincerely Yours is the debut EP by American alternative hip hop duo Bomb Zombies, which consists of producer Nobody and rapper Nocando.  It was released on Hellfyre Club in 2010.

Jeff Weiss of Los Angeles Times called it "a funhouse with a stripper pole installed, pregnant with minimal Roland 808 handclaps, Auto-Tune and enough bass to melt ice."

Track listing

References

External links
 

Alternative hip hop EPs
2010 debut EPs